Gabre is a commune in the Ariège department in southwestern France.

Geography
The Lèze, with the Lake of Mondely, forms part of the commune's southeastern border, flows northeast through the eastern part of the commune, then forms part of its northeastern border.

Population

See also
Communes of the Ariège department

References

Communes of Ariège (department)
Ariège communes articles needing translation from French Wikipedia